Boudewijn Karel Boom (1903–1980) was a Dutch botanist and writer.

References

1903 births
1980 deaths
20th-century Dutch botanists